, also known as  Her Lonely Lane, is a 1962 black-and-white Japanese drama film directed by Mikio Naruse, starring Hideko Takamine. It is based on the autobiographical novel of the same title by writer Fumiko Hayashi and its stage adaptation by Kazuo Kikuta.

Plot
Fumiko Hayashi is a young woman who cannot find a decent job and has been dumped by her boyfriend; she writes on the side. Fumiko's friends tell her that her writing about her life in poverty is excellent and impressive, but no publishing company will buy her autobiographic novel. She continues working as a bar girl and a factory worker and gets together with another aspiring writer, Fukuchi, who has also been struggling to sell his work. Despite the fact that she does all she can for him and cares for him while he suffers from tuberculosis, he abuses her verbally and eventually physically. She walks out of him, returns, and then walks out again. Yasuoka, a warm-hearted and hard-working man, helps Fumiko in every way possible and asks for her hand, but she rejects his proposal—to Fumiko, Yasuoka is more of a friend than a lover. After these struggles, the film ends with her literary success.

Cast
 Hideko Takamine as Fumiko Hayashi
 Akira Takarada as Fukuchi
 Daisuke Katō as Yasuoka
 Tatsuo Endō as Chief editor
 Kinuyo Tanaka as Kishi, Fumiko's mother

References

External links
 Uhlich Keith. " Review: A Wanderer’s Notebook." Slant Magazine, 1 March 2006.
 
 
 
 A Wanderer's Notebook on Mubi

1962 drama films
1962 films
Japanese black-and-white films
Japanese drama films
Toho films
Films based on works by Fumiko Hayashi
Films directed by Mikio Naruse
Films produced by Sanezumi Fujimoto
Films based on autobiographical novels
1960s Japanese films
1960s Japanese-language films